Pararguda nasuta, the wattle snout moth, is a species of moth of the  family Lasiocampidae. It is found in the south-east quarter of Australia.

The wingspan is about 50 mm.

The larvae feed on Exocarpus cupressiformis, Pinus radiata and Acacia species.

References

Lasiocampidae
Moths of Australia
Moths described in 1911